Brian Jacks (born 5 October 1946) is a British judoka who won Britain's first medal at a world championship, taking a bronze in Salt Lake City in 1967, and gained a second bronze at the 1972 Munich Olympics.

Superstars 

Brian Jacks later achieved national fame, due to his enormous upper body strength,  for his outstanding performances on the BBC programme Superstars, all-around sports competition that pits elite athletes from different sports against one another in a series of athletic events resembling a decathlon. He was one of the most successful competitors and dominated the British and European version of the contest from 1979 to 1980, winning four titles.

Jacks was most famous for his efforts in the gymnasium, where he repeatedly set records in the "gym tests", including 100 parallel bar dips in 60 seconds in the 1981 Challenge of the Champions, and 118 squat thrusts in the 1980 World Final.  He was also very dominant in the weightlifting, canoeing and cycling events, rarely placing lower than second.  Jacks was never able to win the World Superstars title, being forced to miss the 1979 event due to illness and finishing third in 1980.  In 1981 he was beaten for the first time in Europe (by Keith Fielding) and would never again compete in Superstars.

His victories in the British and European Superstars led to the creation of the branded computer games: Brian Jacks Superstar Challenge and Brian Jacks Uchi Mata.

Superstars record

Retirement 
After retiring from judo he opened a fitness and martial arts club, and in 1990 he started a company hiring bouncy castles. In 1984 he briefly appeared on the BBC show Micro Live, where he set up his new Atari 800XL with his family.

Jacks lives in Pattaya, Thailand and runs a 60-room hotel/condo building.

Jacks has held the official judo rank of 8th Dan from the British Judo Association (BJA) since November 1994. Although considered retired from judo since the 1990s, and until recently rarely seen on the judo scene for more than 20 years, Jacks is now listed by a British multi-martial arts organization called World Martial Arts Council, as a 10th Dan.

Autobiography
 "Brian Jacks: The Mindset of a Champion", Brian Jacks, 2017 -

References

External links
 

1946 births
Living people
Sportspeople from London
Alumni of the University of Greenwich
British male judoka
Judoka at the 1964 Summer Olympics
Judoka at the 1972 Summer Olympics
Judoka at the 1976 Summer Olympics
Olympic judoka of Great Britain
Olympic bronze medallists for Great Britain
Olympic medalists in judo
Medalists at the 1972 Summer Olympics